Alan Wilder (born September 24, 1953) is an American former actor who has appeared in film and television. Alan is also a member of the Steppenwolf Theater Company. He has appeared in over 55 Steppenwolf productions.

Filmography

References

External links

1953 births
Living people
American male film actors
American male television actors
Male actors from Chicago
Steppenwolf Theatre Company players